Toasted Heretic were an Irish rock group who attracted a cult following in the late 1980s and 1990s. They were founded in Galway in 1985, where singer and lyricist Julian Gough was studying English and philosophy. Their best known early independent released songs include "You Make Girls Unhappy" and "LSD (Isn’t What It Used to Be)" both released on their first two EPs.

They made the top ten of the Irish Singles Chart in 1992 with "Galway and Los Angeles", written by Julian Gough about a chance meeting with Sinéad O'Connor in the entrance to Raidió Teilifís Éireann's Dublin studios.

Discography

Albums
Songs for Swinging Celibates (1988)
Charm and Arrogance (1989)
Another Day, Another Riot (1992)
Mindless Optimism (1994)

Compilation album
Now in New Nostalgia Flavour (2005)

Extended plays
The Smug EP (1990)

Singles
"Galway and Los Angeles" (1991)
"Another Day, Another Riot" (1992)
"LSD (Isn’t What It Used to Be)" (2005)

Members

Current members
Declan Collins (lead guitar)
Neil Farrell (drums)
Julian Gough (vocals)
Aengus McMahon (bass guitar to 1992, then rhythm guitar)
Barry Wallace (bass guitar from 1992)

Former members
Breffni O'Rourke (rhythm guitar 1985-1992, 2005)

References

External links

Irish alternative rock groups
Musical groups established in 1985
Musical groups from County Galway
Music in Galway (city)